
Gmina Radziechowy-Wieprz is a rural gmina (administrative district) in Żywiec County, Silesian Voivodeship, in southern Poland.

Villages
Gmina Radziechowy-Wieprz contains the villages and settlements of Brzuśnik, Bystra, Juszczyna, Przybędza, Radziechowy and Wieprz.

Neighbouring gminas
Gmina Radziechowy-Wieprz is bordered by the town of Żywiec and by the gminas of Jeleśnia, Lipowa, Milówka, Świnna and Węgierska Górka.

References

Radziechowy-Wieprz
Gmina Radziechowy Wieprz